Jang-Mei Wu is a Taiwanese-American mathematician specializing in complex analysis, potential theory, quasiconformal mapping, and partial differential equations. She is a professor emeritus at the University of Illinois at Urbana–Champaign.

Education
Wu did her undergraduate studies at National Taiwan University.
She completed her Ph.D. in 1974 at the University of Illinois at Urbana-Champaign. Her dissertation, An integral problem for positive harmonic functions, was supervised by Maurice Heins.

Recognition
With 
Sun-Yung Alice Chang, Fan Chung, Winnie Li, Mei-Chi Shaw, and Chuu-Lian Terng,
Wu is one of a group of six women mathematicians from National Taiwan University called by Shiing-Shen Chern "a miracle in Chinese history; the glory of the Chinese people". She was elected as a Fellow of the American Mathematical Society in the 2020 class, for "contributions to conformal and quasiconformal mapping theory and potential theory".

References

Year of birth missing (living people)
Living people
20th-century American mathematicians
21st-century American mathematicians
American women mathematicians
20th-century Taiwanese mathematicians
Taiwanese women scientists
National Taiwan University alumni
University of Illinois Urbana-Champaign faculty
Fellows of the American Mathematical Society
Taiwanese emigrants to the United States
20th-century American women scientists
21st-century American women scientists